Kasthuri Shankar is an Indian actress, model and television presenter who has appeared in Tamil, Telugu, Malayalam and Kannada language films.

Personal life
She married Ravikumar, a doctor in 2000. The couple have 2 children, a son and a daughter. Her daughter is a leukaemia survivor.

Career
After graduation from Ethiraj College for Women, Kasthuri won Miss Chennai in 1992. In the same year, she won the Femina Miss Madras beauty pageant too. While studying in college, she started her career in modelling over interest in the domain. Not only was she a successful model, but also, she was a finalist in the BBC's Mastermind India 2000 quiz. Her acting career began in 1991 with the film, Aatha Un Koyilile (1991). From working on small budget Tamil films, she went on to work into more mainstream movies alongside legends, such as Kamal Haasan in Indian (1996). A 30-minute documentary film, Kasthuri: A South Indian Film Star, was released as a tribute to her success in the film industry. She gained attention for her acting skills in Annamayya (1997) and dance performance in Kaadhal Kavithai (1998). 

However, she decided to make a comeback as a supporting actress and television host. Her debut comeback film was Malai Malai (2009) and also worked on Vina Vidai Vettai (2013-2014) for Puthuyugam TV. 

She also notably portrayed a key supporting role as an investigative agent in Adhik Ravichandran's Anbanavan Asaradhavan Adangadhavan (2017), appearing alongside Silambarasan.

Other work

Television
Kasthuri works as quiz master at staged events and on television. She had taken an early interest during childhood in participating in quiz events, and later continued making competitive appearances, and notably appeared as a contestant on BBC's Mastermind India in 2000. She later made a comeback to hosting television-based quiz shows in the 2010s, and worked on Vina Vidai Vettai for Puthuyugam TV.

After rejecting the opportunity to appear on the Tamil reality television show Bigg Boss Tamil in 2018, she joined the third season of the show in 2019 as a wildcard entry contestant.

After that, she made her comeback to Telugu audience in Intinti Gruhalakshmi serial which airs on Star Maa now.

Columns
In the late 1990s, Kasthuri wrote a weekly column titled "Keep It Simple Stupid" in the Kumudham magazine.

Topless photoshoot 
In 2014, she was photographed topless and half-nude as a part of Jade Beall's book The Bodies of Mothers: A Beautiful Body Project.

Comments and social issues
Kasthuri is an active commentator regarding social issues through an occasional column with the Times of India and via Twitter, and her tweets have sometimes elicited debate in the media. In early 2017, she questioned Rajinikanth's ability as a potential politician, and her opinion garnered criticism from the actor's fans. In late 2018, she criticised Rajinikanth's ignorance over the Rajiv Gandhi assassination case and engaged in a further exchange with Rajinikanth's supporters. Kasthuri spoke out as a part of the Me Too movement in India, suggesting that her reluctance to give into patriarchal behaviour meant that she was removed from several film projects. She revealed that one male actor took a particular vengeance against her for her rebuff to his advances, and subsequently made it difficult for her to work on other projects. She criticised directors Bharathiraja and S. Shankar in April 2019, she said director Bharathiraja and his son has black skin and they use North Indian girls with lighter skin in their movies while S. Shankar goes a long way and imports white skin foreign girls in his movies.

A person, who claimed himself to be actor Ajith's fan, had allegedly made sexist comments against Kasturi Shankar in January 2020. A week after this, Kasthuri Shankar blasted him, by suggesting him to ask his mother or sister if he wants a woman for sex. She used the tag #dirtyajithfans, which started trending in India. Some fans of Ajith created #DirtyKasthuriAunty to counter this. A war of words continued and created a controversy.

Filmography 

Television

References

External links
 

Indian film actresses
Living people
Actresses in Malayalam cinema
Actresses in Tamil cinema
Actresses in Telugu cinema
Actresses in Kannada cinema
20th-century Indian actresses
21st-century Indian actresses
Bigg Boss (Tamil TV series) contestants
Actresses in Tamil television
Actresses in Telugu television
Actresses in Malayalam television
Year of birth missing (living people)